Johan Hammond Rosbach (22 August 1921 – 7 September 2004) was a Norwegian author and Esperantist.

Bibliography 
His best known work,  Fianĉo de l'Sorto, (Dansk Esperanto Forlag) 1977, was listed among notable Esperanto works.
An English translation by E. J. Lieberman was approved by him and will be published as "Fiancé of Fate."

External links 
 Johan Hammond Rosbach at NRK Authors

Norwegian Esperantists
Norwegian male writers
1921 births
2004 deaths